Rete degli Studenti Medi is an Italian high-school students' union, created 4 October 2008 from three other student associations active in Italy during the first years of the 21st century.:
Rete degli Studenti (ReDS), national association linked to the main Italian Trade union (CGIL), was founded in 2007 after a division in the oldest Italian Students'Union (UdS) caused by the end of the cooperation between UdS and the CGIL;
Idee Studentesche in Movimento (ISIM), network of local associations that had tried to get over the split between ReDS and UdS;
Studenti di Sinistra (SDS), students' association that supported the DS Party (Italian Party of Democrats of the Left) before the birth of the Italian Democratic Party.

Rete degli Studenti Medi cooperates with UdU, the main Italian University Students'Union and with CGIL, the biggest Italian Trade Union, like UdS did before 2006 and ReDS before 2008.

Since 2016, it's a Candidate Association in the OBESSU, and joins International campaigns and assemblies.

It was part of the National movement "L'Onda" (The Wave) against cuts to the Italian education system made by the Berlusconi government and organized rallies in each Italian region, including the national strike promoted with the CGIL, 14 November 2008.

The idea of a new national High School Students'Union was developed at the "Student Free Camp", organized by ReDS and SDS, from 28 July 2008 to 5 August 2008 near Latina, with also the presence of ISIM members.

Rete degli Studenti Medi is part of the National Forum of the Most Representative Students'Associations that cooperates with the Italian Ministry for Education.

The association cooperates with High School Students'Unions from France (the UNL, the UNL-SD and the SGL), from Belgium (the CEF) from Ireland (ISSU) and from Denmark (EEO) that took part to the "Revolution Camp" the National camp of Rete degli Studenti Medi and UdU, in the editions 2016 and 2017 in Massa, Tuscany and Montalto di Castro, Lazio. The FMDL, National French Association of High School Students'centers, was at the Revolution Camp too, as the beginning of a cooperation about services and welfare in Italian and French High Schools. Rete degli Studenti Medi joined the National Assembly and the National Congress of the UNL, respectively, in November 2015 and April 2016, and participated in the General Assembly of the OBESSU in Amsterdam, the 11 and 12 August 2016, starting the cooperation with other European Students'associations. For the first time as a Candidate Association, RSM had official delegates at the OBESSU Council of Members of December 2016 in Dublin, Ireland, and at the OBESSU General Assembly 2017 in Berlin, Germany.

RSM is an official Member of OBESSU since the International Students'Day 2017, day of the Council of Members of Prague in which RSM Membership was approved by the other member school student unions.

Rete degli Studenti Medi gave its solidarity to Danish student unions after a call of DGS (the General High School student union) against the university reform of 2017, and to Colombian students of ANDES part of the peace process at the end of the civil war between FARC and the Government of Colombia.

It organizes each year rallies and cultural events to celebrate 17 November, the International Student Day, joining international political platforms from the OBESSU and from ESU.

The association promotes in many Italian cities the "Second Hand School Book Market", an event that takes place in schools and in cultural centers, to allow Italian students to buy school books spending less, because the price of school books in Italy is considered too high and it has negative effects on the inclusion of many students.

21 May, the association joins the "Day of Memory and Commitment to commemorate all victims of Mafias", with national rallies, for example in Bologna (Emilia Romagna) in 2015, in Messina (Sicily) in 2016, and Locri (Calabria) in 2017 and demonstrations organised by Libera in different Italian cities.

Rete degli Studenti Medi, with Arci, Libera, CGIL and UdU organizes the "Campi della Legalità" summer camps in nine Italian regions where volunteers can work on lands that were properties of mafia families, which now are controlled by the State and administrated by these associations. Volunteers can visit places linked with the fight against the Mafia and they also learn about history of the anti-mafia movement with the help of people that are directly involved.

At a local and regional level, Rete degli Studenti Medi edits several School Students'Magazines, in particular "Il Mancino" is published in Veneto and Friuli Venezia Giulia, "Panoptes" in Umbria and "Senza Filtro" in Emilia Romagna.

Some of RSM Provincial Confederations organize cultural activities cooperating with Arci, the biggest Italian cultural association, and there are also Circoli Arci (local Arci clubs) directly supported by RSM members, like in Treviso, and Caltanissetta. Similar activities are organized with UdU, CGIL and ANPI.

After the Revolution Camp 2018 the National Board members are: Giammarco Manfreda (Coordinator, from Tuscany), Giulia Titoli (from Umbria), Elena Turchi (from Emilia Romagna), Rachele Scarpa (from Veneto), Francesco Boscheri (from Lazio) and Federico Allegretti (from Sicily). Rachele Scarpa is also the International Officer of the Organization, representing it officially in front of organizations from other countries and in the OBESSU.

It is a democratic Students' Union that fights for students' rights and in favour of public secondary education for all Italian citizens. Rete degli Studenti Medi defends the values of the Italian Constitution, it is against each form of discrimination, racism, fascism and fanaticism. It is not affiliated with political parties, but could be considered a leftist progressive Students' union.

National Spokesperson and Coordinator 
 Luca De Zolt (2008–2010)
 Sofia Sabatino (2010–2012)
 Daniele Lanni (2012–2014)
 Alberto Irone (2014–2016)
 Giammarco Manfreda (2016 – 2019)
 Federico Allegretti (2019-2021)
 Tommaso Biancuzzi (2021-2022)
 Paolo Notarnicola (2022-today)

See also 
 Organising Bureau of European School Student Unions
 CGIL
 Arci

References 

Anti-fascism
Student organisations in Italy